Jason Parillo (Born June 11, 1974 in New York) is an American Mixed Martial Arts (MMA) coach at the RVCA Training Centre and former professional boxer. He is best known for training multiple MMA world champions.

Background

Born in New York in 1974, Parillo was raised in Southern California but still returned to his birthplace each summer until he was 13. Parillo started boxing under Jesse Reid at the age of 16 and started training beginners at 18. He was 24 when entering the professional ranks, following a brief stint as an amateur with a 21–6 record. From 1998 to 2003 he was a professional boxer where he obtained a undefeated boxing Record of 8–0 with 6 knockouts. A detached retina brought an abrupt end to his boxing career. Parillo took a two-year break and began to train others full time.

Pat Tenore, founder of RVCA, and friend of Parillo, was sponsoring MMA fighter, BJ Penn. In 2007, Penn had a rematch against Jens Pulver, a fighter known for his strong boxing, and who used this skill to win their first fight. Tenore introduced the two and Parillo began coaching Penn on boxing. Penn won the rematch against Pulver. Since then Parillo has been training many fighters including former UFC champions, Michael Bisping, Cris Cyborg, Rafael Dos Anjos and Tito Ortiz. Parillo is currently Head Coach based at a BJJ/MMA gym known as The RVCA Sport Training Center. It was built by RVCA founder Pat Tenore (who holds a black belt in Brazilian jiu-jitsu). The training facility is located in Costa Mesa, California.

Personal life
Parillo has twin daughters from a previous marriage.

Notable students

Mixed martial arts
 B.J. Penn - Former UFC Lightweight Champion and UFC Welterweight Champion
 Michael Bisping - Former UFC Middleweight  Champion
 Cris Cyborg - Former UFC Women's Featherweight Champion
 Rafael dos Anjos - Former UFC Lightweight Champion
 Tito Ortiz - Former UFC Light Heavyweight Champion
 Luke Rockhold - Former UFC Middleweight  Champion
 Vitor Belfort - Former UFC Light Heavyweight Champion
 Marlon Vera
 Mackenzie Dern
 Sean Strickland

Professional boxing record

References 

1974 births
Living people
Mixed martial arts trainers
American boxing trainers
American male boxers